Sant Pere de Galligants is Benedictine abbey in Girona, Catalonia. Since 1857, it is home to the Archaeology Museum of Catalonia venue in the city.  The name translates to English as "Saint Peter of Galligants", where Galligants refers to the River Galligants that runs past the abby.

History
The monastery was built from 992, outside the walls of Girona, when Ramon Borrell, count of Barcelona gave to the monks rights over the quarter of Sant Pere. The monks held the ruler of the quarter until 1339, when King Peter IV of Aragon restored it to Aragon.

In 1117 Ramon Berenguer III of Barcelona united the monastery to the Abbey of Sainte-Marie de Lagrasse, in what is now France, though Sant Pere kept an abbot of his own and a large degree of autonomy. Sant Pere was never a big community, and the church was not the local parish, and only baptisms were held in the monastery. In 1362, when the monastery was enclosed within the city's walls, it was redesigned to a more defensive shape.  It started to decay from the 15th century, and in 1592 it was united to the also decaying monasteries of Sant Miquel de Cruïlles and Sant Miquel de Fluvià. In 1835 the monastery included an abbot and four monks.  It was declared a national monument in 1931.

The small cloister is an example of Catalan Romanesque architecture. The northern gallery dates to 1154, while the remaining ones are from 1190. The capitals of the columns have motifs very similar to those in the cloisters of Sant Cugat del Vallès or in the Cathedral of Girona. Some depict scenes from Jesus' life, while others show typical Romanesque elements such as lions or sirens.

Overview
The Romanesque church was built in 1130, and has a nave and two aisles with a transept, and four apses. The portal, in a rather archaic style, comes probably from a previous building. It is surmounted by a rose window with a diameter of 3.5 meters.

The interior features a series of side columns, with capitals having vegetable motifs, used to reinforce the central vault. The capitals of the apse columns are more elaborated, and were probably executed by different artists. Some of them have been attributed to the Master of Cabestany.

The bell tower  has an octagonal plan and two sectors, the upper one, of two floors featuring with double arches divided by columns, decorated with Lombard bands.

See also
Monastery of Sant Daniel, Girona

Sources

External links

Short description and photos of the monastery 

Pere de Galligants
Romanesque architecture in Catalonia
Archaeological museums in Catalonia
Buildings and structures in Girona
Museums in Girona
Religious organizations established in the 10th century
12th-century Roman Catholic church buildings in Spain
Churches completed in 1130